Rowing at the 1988 Summer Olympics in Seoul featured 14 events in total, for men and women, held on the Han River Regatta Course.

The women's quadruple sculls event was held without coxswain for the first time at this Olympics (from 1976 through 1984 it was coxed for women and coxless for men).

Medal table

Men's events

Women's events

See also
 Rowers at the 1988 Summer Olympics

References

 

 

 
1988 Summer Olympics events
1988
1988 in rowing